Manipur College, established in 1958, is one of the oldest degree college in Imphal, Manipur. It offers undergraduate courses in science and arts. It is affiliated to  Manipur University.

Departments

Science
Physics
Chemistry
Mathematics
Botany
Biochemistry

Arts
Manipuri
English
History
Political Science
Economics
Geography
Philosophy

Accreditation
The college is recognized by the University Grants Commission (UGC).

See also
Education in India
Manipur University
Literacy in India
List of institutions of higher education in Manipur

References

External links
http://www.manipurcollege.net/

Colleges affiliated to Manipur University
Educational institutions established in 1958
Universities and colleges in Manipur
1958 establishments in Manipur